Vladimir Todașcă (born 25 June 1957) is a Romanian biathlete. He competed in the 20 km individual event at the 1984 Winter Olympics.

References

1957 births
Living people
People from Suceava County
Romanian male biathletes
Olympic biathletes of Romania
Biathletes at the 1984 Winter Olympics